This article is about the particular significance of the year 1880 to Wales and its people.

Incumbents

Archdruid of the National Eisteddfod of Wales – Clwydfardd

Lord Lieutenant of Anglesey – William Owen Stanley 
Lord Lieutenant of Brecknockshire – Joseph Bailey, 1st Baron Glanusk
Lord Lieutenant of Caernarvonshire – Edward Douglas-Pennant, 1st Baron Penrhyn 
Lord Lieutenant of Cardiganshire – Edward Pryse
Lord Lieutenant of Carmarthenshire – John Campbell, 2nd Earl Cawdor 
Lord Lieutenant of Denbighshire – William Cornwallis-West  
Lord Lieutenant of Flintshire – Hugh Robert Hughes
Lord Lieutenant of Glamorgan – Christopher Rice Mansel Talbot 
Lord Lieutenant of Merionethshire – Edward Lloyd-Mostyn, 2nd Baron Mostyn
Lord Lieutenant of Monmouthshire – Henry Somerset, 8th Duke of Beaufort
Lord Lieutenant of Montgomeryshire – Edward Herbert, 3rd Earl of Powis
Lord Lieutenant of Pembrokeshire – William Edwardes, 4th Baron Kensington
Lord Lieutenant of Radnorshire – Arthur Walsh, 2nd Baron Ormathwaite 

Bishop of Bangor – James Colquhoun Campbell
Bishop of Llandaff – Alfred Ollivant 
Bishop of St Asaph – Joshua Hughes 
Bishop of St Davids – Basil Jones

Events
25 February – The Resurgam, an early mechanically-powered submarine, sinks off Rhyl.
10 March – Six miners are killed in an accident at the Bedwellty Colliery, Tredegar.
29 April – At the United Kingdom general election, Wales elects 28 Liberal MPs. David Davies, Llandinam, is returned unopposed as member for Cardigan.
17 June – The rebuilt Holyhead railway station and inner harbour are officially opened by the Prince of Wales.
15 July – 120 miners are killed in an accident at the Risca Colliery.
3 August – Nine miners are killed in an accident at the Bersham Colliery in Wrexham.
10 December – 101 miners are killed in an accident at the Penygraig Colliery, Rhondda.

Arts and literature
Beriah Gwynfe Evans – Owain Glyndwr, one of the first full-length plays in the Welsh language, is first performed at Llanberis.

Awards
National Eisteddfod of Wales held at Caernarfon (first "official" National Eisteddfod)
Chair – W. B. Joseph, "Athrilyth"
Crown – Ellis Roberts (Elis Wyn o Wyrfai)

New books
Sir William Boyd Dawkins – Early Man in Britain and his place in the Tertiary Period
Amy Dillwyn – The Rebecca Rioter

Music
Joseph Parry – Emmanuel (cantata)

Sport
Football – The Druids of Rhiwabon win the Welsh Cup for the first time.
Rugby union – Cwmbran RFC and Crumlin RFC are founded.
Yachting – Penarth Yacht Club is founded as Penarth Boat Club.

Births
31 January – Phil Hopkins, Wales international rugby player (died 1966)
12 February – William Joseph Rhys, writer (died 1967)
17 March – Harry Grindell Matthews, inventor (died 1941)
8 April – Thomas Thomas, boxing champion (died 1911)
19 April – Jack Jenkins, Wales international rugby player (died 1971)
30 April – George Maitland Lloyd Davies, pacifist (died 1949)
9 May – Thomas Scott-Ellis, 8th Baron Howard de Walden, patron of the arts (died 1946)
11 May – David Davies, 1st Baron Davies, politician (died 1944)
22 May
Dr Teddy Morgan, Wales international rugby player (died 1947)
Robert John Rowlands ('Meuryn'), journalist and poet (died 1967)
31 May – Edward Tegla Davies, author (died 1967)
22 June – Rhys Gabe, rugby player (died 1967)
27 July – Percy Baker, gymnast (died 1957)
2 September – Isaac Daniel Hooson, poet (died 1948)
15 September – William Charles Williams, VC recipient (died 1915)
20 September – Ernie Jenkins, Wales international rugby player (died 1958)

Deaths
6 January – John Thomas ('Minimus'), minister and author, 71
12 February – John Whitehead Greaves, slate mine proprietor, 72
2 March – Charles Meredith, Tasmanian politician, 68
12 April – Thomas Joseph Brown, Roman Catholic bishop, 81
23 April – Robert Thomas ('Ap Vychan'), minister and writer, 70
10 May – David Charles II, hymn-writer, 76?
21 August – Evan Mathew Richards, politician, 68
30 August – Mordecai Jones, industrialist, 67
9 September – William Watkin Edward Wynne, politician and antiquarian, 78

References

 
Wales